Malubiting; also known as Malubiting West) is the second highest  
peak in the Haramosh Group of Mountains, a subrange of the Karakoram range of Pakistan. It is situated in the middle of Bilchar Dobani  and Haramosh Peak in Haramosh valley Gilgit-Baltistan .

Location 
Malubiting lies in the heart of the Haramosh Group of Mountains, which rise above the north bank of the Indus River Malubiting lies about 50 km east of Gilgit, the most important town in the region. Malubiting rises steeply over the Haramosh Jutial village  (Phuparash) River to the southwest, while on the east the large Chogo Lungma Glacier starts on its slopes.

Climbing history 
Malubiting was unsuccessfully attempted in 1955, 1959, 1968, 1969 and 1970 and 1971 before the first ascent in 1971. In that year an Austrian team led by Horst Schindlbacher reached the summit via the Northeast Ridge, ascending the North Peak and skirting the Central Peak on the way.

According to the Himalayan Index, there has been only one additional ascent, by a Swiss-German team in 1997, via the original route. (There may however have been other ascents that did not make it into the Index.)

Sources 
 High Asia: An Illustrated History of the 7000 Metre Peaks by Jill Neate, 
 Orographical Sketch Map of the Karakoram by Jerzy Wala, 1990. Published by the Swiss Foundation for Alpine Research.
 Himalayan Index

Mountains of Gilgit-Baltistan
Seven-thousanders of the Karakoram